The following lists the top 25 albums of 2017 in Australia from the Australian Recording Industry Association (ARIA) end-of-year albums chart.

Ed Sheeran's album ÷ was the most popular album in Australia in 2017. The album spent 22 weeks at number 1 across the year and remained in the top 10 for the entire 43 weeks since release, selling over 420,000 copies. Adele's album 25 came in at number 4, after being number 1 in 2015 and 2016. Eleven soundtrack albums feature in top 100 with the most popular, Moana, charting at number 5. For the 7th year in a row, Michael Bublé's Christmas made the end of year top ten.

Paul Kelly's Life is Fine was the highest selling album by an Australian artist in 2017.

Top 25  

Note: 25, x, +, Friends for Christmas, The Very Best and Ripcord peaked at number 1 but not in 2017.

See also  
 List of number-one albums of 2017 (Australia) 
 List of top 10 albums in 2017 (Australia) 
 List of Top 25 singles for 2017 in Australia 
 2017 in music 
 ARIA Charts 
 List of Australian chart achievements and milestones

References 

 

Australian record charts
2017 in Australian music
Australia Top 25 Albums